The Mayor of Palm Bay, Florida is the presiding officer at city council meetings and the official head of the City of Palm Bay, Florida for all ceremonial occasions. The current mayor of Palm Bay, is William Capote.

References

Palm Bay
Mayors